The Indonesian League in badminton is a team competition established in 2007 and held in Indonesia.

The total prize will be around US$98,000.

History
This league has been conceptualized since 2003, but until four years later it had not become real due to the numerous obstacles.

The first competition was held for 10 days in Jakarta beginning June 21, 2007.

Format
The competition involves eight Indonesian clubs in the final rounds, with a format similar to the Thomas and Uber Cup. The five best clubs will qualify for the final, and qualifying rounds will be competitions for the other three places.

The teams
Ten men's teams from ten clubs had a qualification round. The teams selected were:
Indocafe, Medan
Ratih, Banten
Aufa, Jakarta
Musica Champion, Kudus
BPKD, Kukar
Wima, Surabaya
Mutiara, Bandung
Kotab Dishub, Bandung
South Suco, South Sulawesi
Randik, South Sumatra

Seven women's teams from seven clubs had a qualification round. The teams selected were:
Indocafe, Medan
Ratih, Banten
Bina Bangsa, Jakarta
Semen Gresik, Surabaya
Mutiara, Bandung
Kotab Dishub, Bandung
South Suco, South Sulawesi

Another five teams (men's teams and a women's team) had a bye to the grand final round. The teams were:
Djarum, Kudus
Jayaraya, Jakarta
Suryanaga Gudang Garam, Surabaya
Tangkas, Jakarta
SGS Elektrik, Bandung

Grand Final round

After qualification, three teams from the men's and women's division took their place in a grand final round. From the men's division, the Musica Champion, Mutiara and Ratih teams won a ticket to the grand final round. And from the women's division, the Mutiara, Bina Bangsa and Ratih teams won a ticket for a match in the grand final round.

And at the last round, the Suryanaga Gudang Garam team won the men's team competition after beating the Tangkas team. From women's team competition, Tangkas was a surprise champion after defeating the first seed team, Jayaraya.

Men's team semifinal
Suryanaga Gudang Garam ( 3–0 ) Tangkas
the winner of the match in bold

Women's team grand final
Tangkas ( 3–2 ) Jayaraya
the winner of the match in bold

References

External links
Official website

Badminton tournaments in Indonesia
Annual sporting events in Indonesia
Recurring sporting events established in 2007
National badminton championships
Professional sports leagues in Indonesia
2007 establishments in Indonesia